Meshes is an EP by Pram, released in April 1994 through Too Pure.

Track listing

Personnel 
Rosie Cuckston – vocals, keyboards
Matt Eaton - guitar, bass guitar, keyboards, sampler
Sam Owen – bass guitar, guitar, keyboards, backing vocals
Pram – recording
Max Simpson – keyboards, sampler
Daren Garratt – drums

References

External links 
 

1994 EPs
Pram (band) albums
Too Pure EPs